Colus stimpsoni, common name the Stimpson's colus, is a species of sea snail, a marine gastropod mollusk in the family Colidae, the true whelks and the like.

Description

Distribution
The species has been found in the Bay of Fundy in Canada, and various other gulfs situated about the western shores of northern America.

References

External links
 Mörch, O. A. L. (1870). Fauna Molluscorum Islandiae. Oversigt over Islands Blöddyr. Videnskabelige Meddelelser fra den naturhistoriske Forening i Kjøbenhavn. 1868 (11-13): 185-229.
 L. A. (1847-1848). Monograph of the genus Fusus. In: Conchologia Iconica, or, illustrations of the shells of molluscous animals, vol. 4, pls 1-21 and unpaginated text. L. Reeve & Co., London.
  Sowerby, G. B. II. (1880). Monograph of the genus Fusus. In G. B. Sowerby II (ed.), Thesaurus conchyliorum, or monographs of genera of shells. Vol. 4 (35-36): 69–97, pl. 406–417bis. London, privately published
 Jeffreys, J. G. (1862-1869). British conchology. Vol. 1: pp. cxiv + 341 (1862). Vol. 2: pp. 479 (1864). Vol. 3: pp. 394 (1865). Vol. 4: pp. 487 (1867). Vol. 5: pp. 259 (1869) London, van Voorst
 Verrill, A.E. (1882). Catalogue of marine Mollusca added to the fauna of the New England region, during the past ten years. Transactions of the Connecticut Academy of Arts and Sciences. 5(2): 447-587, pls 42-44, 57-58
 [httpsVerrill, A. E. (1880). Notice of recent addition to the marine Invertebrata of the northeastern coast of America, with descriptions of new genera and species and critical remarks on others. Part II - Mollusca, with notes on Annelida, Echinodermata, etc, collected by the United States Fish Commission. Proceedings of the United States National Museum. 3: 356-409]://biodiversitylibrary.org/page/14917456

Colidae
Gastropods described in 1868